The Far Field is the fifth studio album by American synthpop band Future Islands, released on April 7, 2017 through 4AD. Several parallels can be made between this studio album and the band's second studio album, In Evening Air: both are titled after the final volume of poetry by Theodore Roethke, and both have  album art produced by former band member Kymia Nawabi.

Critical reception

The Far Field received generally positive reviews from music critics. At Metacritic, which assigns a normalized rating out of 100 to reviews from mainstream critics, the album received an average score of 77, based on 29 reviews, which indicates "generally favorable reviews" and UK-based music webzine Drowned In Sound ranked it at 98 on their list of 100 favorite albums of 2017.

Track listing

Charts

References

2014 albums
Future Islands albums
4AD albums
Albums produced by Chris Coady